The list of ship launches in 2015 includes a chronological list of ships launched in 2015.


See also

References

2015
Ship launches
 
Ship launches